Web server benchmarking is the process of estimating a web server performance in order to find if the server can serve sufficiently high workload.

Key parameters
The performance is usually measured in terms of:
Number of requests that can be served per second (depending on the type of request, etc.);
Latency response time in milliseconds for each new connection or request;
Throughput in bytes per second (depending on file size, cached or not cached content, available network bandwidth, etc.).

The measurements must be performed under a varying load of clients and requests per client.

Tools for benchmarking
Load testing (stress/performance testing) a web server can be performed using automation/analysis tools such as:
Apache JMeter, an open-source Java load testing tool
ApacheBench (or ab), a command line program bundled with Apache HTTP Server
Httperf, a command line program originally developed at HP Labs
Siege, an open-source web-server load testing and benchmarking tool
Curl-loader, a software performance testing open-source tool
OpenSTA, a GUI-based utility for Microsoft Windows-based operating systems
Wrk, an open-source C load testing tool

Web application benchmarks
Web application benchmarks measure the performance of application servers and database servers used to host web applications. TPC-W was a common benchmark emulating an online bookstore with synthetic workload generation.

References

External links
Microsoft's patterns & practices Performance Testing Guidance for Web Applications
Stress tools to test your Web server at Microsoft's knowledge base
Open Source Performance Testing tools
SPECweb2009 Release 1.20 Benchmark Design Document
HTTP(S) benchmark tools, testing/debugging
h2load - HTTP/2 benchmarking tool - HOW-TO

Benchmarks (computing)